Habronattus elegans is a species of spiders in the family Salticidae (jumping spiders). It is found in the United States and in Mexico.

References

External links 
 Habronattus elegans at the World Spider Catalog

Salticidae
Spiders of Mexico
Spiders of the United States
Spiders described in 1901